Nabil Hasan al-Faqih (born 1968) is a Yemeni politician. He quit his position as Minister of Tourism over the 2011 Yemeni uprising. He served as Civil Service and Insurance minister from 2018 to 2020.

References

21st-century Yemeni politicians
Living people
Date of birth missing (living people)
Place of birth missing (living people)
1968 births

Civil Service ministers of Yemen
Tourism ministers of Yemen
Mujawar Cabinet
First Maeen Cabinet